Frank Fisher may refer to:

 Frank Fisher (ice hockey) (1907–1983), Canadian ice hockey player
 Frank Fisher (rugby league) (1905–1980), Aboriginal Australian rugby league player
 Frank R. Fisher (born 1926), jazz trumpeter, music arranger, and composer
 Frank Fisher (politician) (1877–1960), New Zealand politician and tennis player
 Franz Jakubowski (1912–1970), Western Marxist theorist, who changed his name to Frank Fisher

See also
Frank Fischer (fl. 1980s), East German sprint canoer